Herschel Harper "Herky" Green (July 3, 1920 – August 16, 2006) was a World War II flying ace in the United States Army Air Forces. Green was the leading ace of the Fifteenth Air Force, shooting down 18 enemy aircraft and destroying 10 more on the ground. 

Green was born in Mayfield, Kentucky.

325th Fighter Group

Green flew in 1943 and 1944 in the North Africa and Italian campaigns with the 325th Fighter Group. By the end of 1944, he had flown 100 missions and received the Distinguished Service Cross, Purple Heart, Air Medal with 25 Oak Leaf Clusters, Silver Star, and two Distinguished Flying Crosses.

Memoir
He published his memoir Herky!: the Memoirs of a Checkertail Ace in 1996. The "Checkertail" refers to the group's recognition markings. The tail of each aircraft was painted yellow with black squares. He died in Torrance, California, aged 86.

Notes

References

 Green, Herschel H. Herky! The Memoirs of a Checkertail Ace. Atglen, Pennsylvania: Schiffer Publishing, 1996 (republished in 2000). .
 McDowell, Ernest R. Checkertails: The 325th Fighter Group in the Second World War. Carrollton, Texas: Squadron/Signal Publications, Inc., 1994. .
 McDowell, Ernest R. and William N. Hess. Checkertail Clan: The 325th Fighter Group in North Africa and Italy. Fallbrook, California: Aero Publishers, Inc., 1969.

External links
 

1920 births
2006 deaths
American World War II flying aces
Aviators from Kentucky
Military personnel from Kentucky
People from Mayfield, Kentucky
Recipients of the Distinguished Flying Cross (United States)
Recipients of the Silver Star
Recipients of the Distinguished Service Cross (United States)
Recipients of the Air Medal
United States Army Air Forces officers
Writers from Kentucky